Stockinger is a surname. Notable people with the surname include:

Brigitta Stockinger, British scientist
Francisco Stockinger (1919–2009), Austrian artist
Hannes Stockinger (born 1955), Austrian scientist
Marlon Stöckinger (born 1991), Filipino racing driver
Martin Stockinger, Austrian cross-country skier